Chal Guru Ho Ja Shuru  is a 2015 Hindi film Produced by Pankaj Narayan and Apoorva Bajaj of Ath Entertainment Pvt. Ltd. in association with Himalayan Dreams, the film is a take on the fake godman who rules the roost these days. The film is a comic satire on the life of the many fake new-age gurus who thrive at the ignorance of general public. It is a satire on those who use religion for their petty personal gains. At same time, the film also carries a strong social message. Directed by Manoj Sharma, who was in news some years back for his another directorial venture Swaha: Life Beyond Superstition. The lead role is played by actor Hemant Pandey who essayed the rile of Pandeyji in the noted TV serial Office Office, that was telecast on Sab TV. 
Sanjay Mishra, best known for his character of Apple Singh, an "icon" used by ESPN Star Sports during the 1999 Cricket World Cup, is also portraying an important role in the film. In fact, most actors of Office Office have been roped for this film. Others include Chandrachur Singh, Brijendra Kala, Geeta Bisht, Tiku Talsania, Govind Pandey and Vrajesh Hirjee. The film was released in India on 30 January 2015.

The movie had been exempted from tax by Chief Minister of Uttarakhand Harish Rawat ahead of its release.

Synopsis
They are gurus and they are out to cheat everyone. The movie tells the story of out-of-work theatre artistes, who find another way to earn some quick bucks. They turn into gurus/babas/godmen to con innocent victims. How long can they put up this act?

Cast
 Hemant Pandey
 Chandrachur Singh
 Vrajesh Hirjee
 Sanjay Mishra
 Manoj Pahwa
 Brijendra Kala
 Tiku Talsania
 Pawan Kumar Sharma
 Mithilesh Chaturvedi

Music
The music of the film is composed and written by Praveen Bhardwaj.

Reception
In his review for India Today, Saurabh Dwivedi said that the film was brave yet was "marred by weak script, vulgar dialogues and impossible climax".

References

External links 
 Chal Guru Ho Ja Shuru Official Trailer Hemant Pandey, Chandrachur Singh, Sanjay Mishra YouTube
 

2010s Hindi-language films
2015 films
Films directed by Manoj Sharma